Doug Pruden of Canada holds or held nine world records in push ups, and holds thirteen Canadian records in push ups.

History
Doug Pruden grew up in Northern Alberta. In his late teens he adopted general fitness as his favourite way to stay in shape. Doing body weight exercises gave rise to a motivation to perform greater amounts of exercise in shorter periods of time. In order to keep track of push ups, his favourite exercise, Pruden videotaped challenges that lasted 1 minute, 10 minutes, and 30 minutes. This led to many world record attempts from 2000 to 2008.

Pruden has appeared in the Guinness World Records book 4 times, and The Book of Alternative Records 8 times.
As of 2009 Pruden holds 10 world records in various push up categories: one arm, one arm back of the hand, back of the hands, and fist/knuckles. The most he has ever done in regular push ups is 10,000 in 8 hours. In 2005 he attempted breaking the long-time British record held by Kevin Jefferson, whose 2003 UK record was 1582 back of hand push ups in one hour. Pruden completed more than 1800 on his first attempt, but due to errors in the claim, it was rejected. On July 8, 2005 he reapplied to Guinness World Records for the 1 hour record. The final official count in this new record was 1781 which was accepted by Guinness. On November 8, 2009 he did 1025 one arm back of the hand push ups in 1 hour at the Don Wheaton Family YMCA.

Push up Records 

 5557 Fist push ups in 3:02:30 hours on July 9, 2004 
 1000 Fist push ups in 18:13 minutes on July 9, 2003  
 114 one arm push ups in one minute in March 2003  
 546 one arm push ups in 10 minutes on July 30, 2003 
 1382 one arm push ups in 30 minutes on July 30, 2003 
 1,777 one arm push ups in 1 hour in November 2004 (2521 world record Paddy Doyle) 
 1781 Back of Hand push ups in 1 hour on July 8, 2005 (world record of 1940 held by Paddy Doyle) 
 677 push ups on one arm on the Back of hand on November 9, 2005 
 1025 push ups on one arm on the back of hand on November 8, 2008 
 59 push ups on one arm on the Back of Hand in one minute on March 24, 2007

Publicity
Pruden has appeared on numerous television shows including the Late Show with David Letterman, Open Mike with Mike Bullard, Big Breakfast, CTV news feature story, The National Post, The Globe and Mail, and many other newspapers and radio stations. He has entries (with photo)in the 2008, Guinness World Records book and 2010 book, Open Record Book, The Book of Alternative Records   [www.alternativerecords.co.uk]; an entry in Canada’s Biggest, Smallest, Fastest, Strongest. by: [www.lonepinepublishing.com] Lonepine Publishers, To be released April 2010. Avenue Magazine feature story of Edmonton performers. [www.avenuemagazine.com]. also Dec. issue.  "Hector ig Canada" world record holder mentioned TG4 television site.  "Ira's Abs" website story.  Doug is also mentioned in the new 2010 book by Paul Wade (coach), "Convict Conditioning" How to bust free of all weakness- using the lost secrets of supreme survival strength".  Doug is mentioned on page 68 of the book available at DragonDoor.com website. Doug Pruden is in a story by Mark Lamoureux [www.vice.com]   Doug Pruden is in a story and blog by Todd Kuslikis of [www.ashotofadrenaline.net] Jan 26, 2016. Doug Pruden is named twice in the Guinness World Records website.

Politics
In 1992, Doug Pruden ran for City Council in Edmonton, Canada in Ward 5. He placed last in the ward race for City Councillor against seven other candidates, receiving a total of 1,949 votes.

References

External links
Guinness World Records
The Book of Alternative Records
 Edmonton History, Remember When, memories,Doug Pruden
 City of Edmonton Election Results 1945 - 2010

Sportspeople from Alberta
Living people
Northern Alberta Institute of Technology alumni
Place of birth missing (living people)
Year of birth missing (living people)